TP Tea (short for Taiwan Professional Tea), formerly known as Tea Pa Tea, is a subsidiary of Chun Shui Tang. Similar to most bubble tea shops in Taiwan, TP Tea only sells bubble tea, though snacks are sold occasionally for a limited time.

History 
The chain was founded in 2005, and has since spread to China, Japan, Hong Kong, Singapore, Vietnam, Thailand and the United States.

The first TP Tea shop in Hong Kong was opened in 2016, which is located in Tin Hau. The brand began operating in Singapore in 2018. The first U.S. shop opened in Cupertino, California, in 2018. The business has also operated in Seattle's Chinatown–International District.

References

External links

 

2005 establishments in Taiwan
Bubble tea brands